

Overview
Andhra Pradesh State FiberNet Limited, AP State FiberNet Limited, or APSFL is a fully-owned entity of the Government of Andhra Pradesh, India, started in October 2015. The project aims to provide affordable end-to-end broadband, wifi connection, internet facility, cable television, and phone connectivity in the state of Andhra Pradesh, India. The project was announced by N. Chandrababu Naidu and was launched by the President of India on December 27, 2017 in a ceremony conducted in the capital city of Amaravati.

It is owned by the Government of Andhra Pradesh, but has a partnership with Cisco Systems. The project seeks to provide accessible Broadband connectivity on a non-discriminatory basis to households and corporate users, including an expansion of internet access for users in rural areas. Its main aim is to provide 15 to 50 Mbit/s unlimited connections to all residents of Andhra pradesh, and 100 Mbit/s to 1 Gbit/s connections to businesses. The APSFL network also provides Internet Protocol television with over 200 channels and a landline telephone connection for free and unlimited calling to AP fiber phones within Andhra Pradesh.

Implementation

Currently there are 2,449 sub-stations throughout the state. The target was eventually met in September 2020. A network operations center has been commissioned at Visakhapatnam to look after the project in the state.

Network
The network utilizes a ring-like architecture that is distributed across all 13 districts of Andhra Pradesh. It is a 1.3 Gbit/s dense wavelength-division multiplexing based optical fibre network arranged in a state ring with each district ring as a 100G DWDM subnet. As of September 2020, APSFL has over 970,000 users. Over 3,000 schools, universities, and government offices are connected to the network. It provides an average speed of 200 Gbit/s to its users.

See also
 Jio
 BSNL Broadband
 BSNL Mobile
 Sanchar
Atria Convergence Technologies
 APSFL

References

State agencies of Andhra Pradesh
Companies based in Visakhapatnam
Telecommunications companies of India
Indian companies established in 2015
Telecommunications companies established in 2015
2015 establishments in Andhra Pradesh
Government agencies established in 2015